Eleanor Blum, (March 18, 1909 – July 7, 2011), is the author of scientific papers and bibliographies. She has a PhD in the communication sciences. Blum was the librarian for the communication library at the University of Illinois, UIUC College of Media from 1953 to 1978. She was also Professor Emerita of Library Science at the University of Illinois Urbana-Champaign.

Bibliographies
Basic books in the mass media
Mass media bibliography: an annotated guide to books and journals for research and reference
Paperbound books in the United States in 1955: a survey of content

Papers
BOOK PUBLISHING - WHAT IT IS, WHAT IT DOES
HISTORY OF BOOK PUBLISHING IN UNITED-STATES .1. CREATION OF AN INDUSTRY 1630-1865
HISTORY OF BOOK PUBLISHING IN THE UNITED-STATES .3. GOLDEN-AGE BETWEEN 2 WARS 1920-1940
A HISTORY OF BOOK PUBLISHING IN THE UNITED-STATES, VOL 4, THE GREAT CHANGE, 1940–1980
BOOK SELECTION AND CENSORSHIP IN SIXTIES
THE USE OF BOOKS AND LIBRARIES 
PAPERBACK BOOK PUBLISHING - A SURVEY OF CONTENT 
FLIGHT FROM REASON - ESSAYS ON INTELLECTUAL FREEDOM IN ACADEMY, PRESS, AND LIBRARY
INTERNATIONAL ENCYCLOPEDIA OF COMMUNICATIONS 
WOMEN, COMMUNICATION, AND CAREERS
PRINTED BOOK IN AMERICA
ONE BOOK-5 WAYS - THE PUBLISHING PROCEDURES OF 5 UNIVERSITY PRESSES
...

References

1909 births
2011 deaths
American centenarians
Women centenarians
University of Illinois Urbana-Champaign faculty